Duke's Artistry is an album led by pianist Duke Jordan recorded in 1978 and released on the Danish SteepleChase label.

Reception

In review issued on May 3, 1980, Billboard editors said that the songs of the album were "unspectacular" but the "beauty of this LP lies in its simplicity".

Track listing
All compositions by Duke Jordan
 "My Heart Skips a Beat" - 5:52
 "Midnight Moonlight" - 6:39	
 "My Heart Skips a Beat" [Alternate Take 1] - 5:49 Bonus track on CD release
 "My Heart Skips a Beat" [Alternate Take 2] - 4:55 Bonus track on CD release
 "Lady Dingbat" - 8:18
 "Midnite Bump No. 1" - 6:06 Bonus track on CD release
 "Midnite Bump No. 2" - 6:09 
 "Dodge City Roots" - 5:57

Personnel
Duke Jordan - piano
Art Farmer - flugelhorn  
David Friesen - bass 
Philly Joe Jones - drums

References

1978 albums
Duke Jordan albums
SteepleChase Records albums